W. James Porter  (31 July 1901 – 1967) was a Scottish football player and manager who played as a right-half.

Born in Hamilton, Lanarkshire, he began his career with nearby Wishaw YMCA before moving to England to join Bury in 1921. He played for Bury for 15 seasons, making 396 league appearances and scoring seven goals (421 appearances, 8 goals in all competitions). 

In November 1937, he was hired by Manchester United to serve as one of the club's scouting network. By that December, his responsibilities had extended to coaching (the League Managers Association website lists him as the club's manager for most of the Second World War period, but it is generally considered that he was assistant to Walter Crickmer, and there is no mention of him in club records beyond the end of the 1938–39 season).

Porter took over as manager of Bury in March 1944, but stepped down in June 1945 to become the assistant to his successor, Norman Bullock. In 1949, he was appointed as manager of Accrington Stanley, a position he held until March 1951.

Managerial statistics

See also
 List of one-club men in association football

References

External links
 

1901 births
1967 deaths
Date of death missing
Place of death missing
Accrington Stanley F.C. (1891) managers
Association football wing halves
Bury F.C. managers
Bury F.C. players
English Football League players
English Football League managers
Manchester United F.C. non-playing staff
Bury F.C. non-playing staff
Scottish footballers
Scottish football managers
Footballers from Hamilton, South Lanarkshire
Association football scouts
Association football coaches